The Synclavier is an early digital synthesizer, polyphonic digital sampling system, and music workstation manufactured by New England Digital Corporation of Norwich, Vermont. It was produced in various forms from the late 1970s into the early 1990s. The instrument has been used by prominent musicians.

History 

The original design and development of the Synclavier prototype occurred at Dartmouth College with the collaboration of Jon Appleton, Professor of Digital Electronics, Sydney A. Alonso, and Cameron Jones, a software programmer and student at Dartmouth's Thayer School of Engineering.

Synclavier I 
First released in 1977–78, it proved to be highly influential among both electronic music composers and music producers, including Mike Thorne, an early adopter from the commercial world, due to its versatility, its cutting-edge technology, and distinctive sounds.

The early Synclavier I used FM synthesis, re-licensed from Yamaha, and was sold mostly to universities.  The initial models had only a computer and synthesis modules; later models added a musical keyboard and control panel.

Synclavier II 

The system evolved in its next generation of product, the Synclavier II, which was released in early 1980 with the strong influence of music producer Denny Jaeger of Oakland, California. It was originally Jaeger's suggestion that the FM synthesis concept be extended to allow four simultaneous channels or voices of synthesis to be triggered with one key depression to allow the final synthesized sound to have much more harmonic series activity. This change greatly improved the overall sound design of the system and was very noticeable. 16-bit user sampling (originally in mono only) was added as an option in 1982. This model was succeeded by the ABLE Model C computer-based PSMT in 1984 and then the Mac-based 3200, 6400 and 9600 models, all of which used the VPK keyboard.

Keyboard controller 

Synclavier II models used an on/off type keyboard (called the "ORK") while later models, labeled simply "Synclavier", used a weighted velocity- and pressure-sensitive keyboard (called the "VPK") that was licensed from Sequential Circuits and used in their Prophet-T8 synthesizer.

Digital sampling 

The company evolved the system continuously through the early 1980s to integrate the first 16-bit digital sampling system to magnetic disk, and eventually a 16-bit polyphonic sampling system to memory, as well. The company's product was the only digital sampling system that allowed sample rates to go as high as 100 kHz.

Tapeless studio concept 

Ultimately, the system was referred to as the Synclavier Digital Recording "Tapeless Studio" system among many professionals. It was a pioneer system in revolutionizing movie and television sound effects and Foley effects methods of design and production starting at Glen Glenn Sound. Although pricing made it inaccessible for most musicians (a Synclavier could cost anywhere from $25,000 to $200,000), it found widespread use among producers and professional recording studios, competing at times in this market with high-end production systems such as the Fairlight CMI.

Technological achievements 
When the company launched and evolved its technology, there were no off-the-shelf computing systems, integrated software, nor sound cards. Consequently, all of the hardware from the company's main real-time CPU, all input and output cards, analog-to-digital and digital-to-analog cards and its memory cards were developed internally, as well as all of the software. The hardware and software of the company's real-time capability was used in other fields completely remote to music, such as the main Dartmouth College campus computing node computers for one of the USA's first campus-wide computing networks, and in medical data acquisition research projects.

End of manufacture 
New England Digital ceased operations in 1993. According to Jones, "The intellectual property was bought up by a bank—then it was owned by a Canadian company called Airworks—and I bought the intellectual property and the trademark back from a second bank which had foreclosed on it from Airworks."

Reincarnations 
In 2019, Jones released an iOS version of the Synclavier dubbed Synclavier Go! using much of the original code base. Jones has also worked with Arturia to bring the Synclavier V software version of the instrument to their V Collection plugin suite.

In 2022, Synclavier Digital released and started production on the Regen, a desktop FM synthesizer.

Models and options

Prototype 
 Dartmouth Digital Synthesizer (1973)

Processor 
 ABLE computer (1975): an early product of New England Digital, was a 16-bit mini-computer on two cards, using a transport-triggered architecture. It used a variant of XPL called Scientific XPL for programming. Early applications of the ABLE were for laboratory automation, data collection, and device control. The commercial version of the Dartmouth Digital Synthesizer, the Synclavier, was built on this processor.

Digital synthesis cards 
 The FM/Additive synthesis waveforms are produced by the Synclavier Synthesizer cards (named SS1 through SS5). Each set of these five cards produced 8 mono FM voices (later variants supported stereo). The processor handles sending start-stop-setPitch-setParameter commands to the SS card set(s), as well as handling scanning of the keyboard and control panel. There is little public documentation available on these cards, as their design was the unique asset of the Synclavier. However, their structure was similar to other digital synthesizers of the mid-late 1970s realized in Medium Scale Integration (MSI) hardware, such as the Bell Labs Digital Synthesizer.

Black panel models 

On 1970s–late 1980s:

 Synclavier I (1977)
 Hand Operated Processor (HOP box): a troubleshooting tool for the Synclavier system, connected to ABLE computer via "D01 Front Panel Interface Card".

 Synclavier II (1980): 8-bit FM/additive synthesis, 32-track memory recorder, and ORK keyboard. Earlier models were entirely controlled via ORK keyboard with buttons and wheel; a VT100 terminal was subsequently introduced for editing performances. Later models had a VT640 graphic terminal for graphical audio analysis (described below).
 Original Keyboard (ORK, c.1979): original musical keyboard controller in a wooden chassis, with buttons and silver control wheel on the panel.
 Sample-to-Disk (STD, c.1982): a first commercial hard disk streaming sampler, with 16-bit sampling at up to 50 kHz.
 Sample-to-Memory (STM): later option to sample sounds and edit them in computer memory.
 Direct-to-Disk (DTD, c.1984): an early commercial hard disk recording system.
 Signal File Manager: a software program operated via VT640 graphic terminal, enabling 'Additive Resynthesis' and complex audio analysis.
 Digital Guitar Interface
 SMPTE timecode tracking
 MIDI interface

 Synclavier PSMT (1984): a faster ABLE Model C processor-based system, with a new 'Multi-Channel-Distribution' real-time digitally controlled analog signal routing technology, and 16-bit RAM-based stereo sampling subsystem. The monaural FM voice card was doubled up and enabling software panning for stereo output was introduced.
 Velocity/Pressure Keyboard (VPK, c.1984): a weighted velocity/after-pressure sensitive musical keyboard controller, was introduced. This had a black piano lacquer finished chassis, a larger display, additional buttons and a silver control wheel.

Ivory panel models 

In late 1980s–1993; operated via Macintosh II as terminal.
 Synclavier 3200
 Synclavier 6400
 Synclavier 9600
 Synclavier TS (Tapeless Studio): consists of Synclavier and Direct-to-Disk
 Synclavier Post Pro: consists of Direct-to-Disk
 Synclavier Post Pro SD (Sound Design): consists of small Synclavier and Direct-to-Disk

Notable users 

 Laurie Anderson is credited with using the Synclavier on her albums Mister Heartbreak (1984), United States Live (1984) and the 1986 soundtrack album Home of the Brave.
 Wally Badarou: used the Synclavier II on Level 42 and solo studio albums, as well as on the 1985 Kiss of the Spider Woman movie additional soundtrack.
 Tony Banks of Genesis used a Synclavier II (ORK version) on the albums Genesis (1983) and Invisible Touch (1986) and their respective tours, along with solo albums and soundtracks of that period, notably on "Mama" and "Home by the Sea".
 Christopher Boyes, supervising sound editor/sound designer for the 2009 film Avatar, used the Synclavier for blending or layering different sound effects and matching pitches.
 Joel Chadabe: composer/founder of Electronic Music Foundation. In September 1977 he bought the first Synclavier without musical keyboard (ORK) and wrote custom software to control the Synclavier via various devices.
 Suzanne Ciani used a Synclavier to design sounds for the Bally Xenon pinball game released in 1980.
 The Church used it on "Under the Milky Way" (1988). The way it is arranged gives a sound similar to bagpipes.
 Chick Corea used the Synclavier on various Elektric Band albums from 1986 to 1991 as well as various Elektric Band tours.
 Crimson Glory used acoustic drums blended with Synclavier-sampled drums on their 1988 album Transcendence.
 Paul Davis: singer/songwriter, producer at Monarch Sound in Atlanta.
 Depeche Mode had access to producer Daniel Miller's Synclavier, which was responsible for the character of the sound of the albums Construction Time Again (1983), Some Great Reward (1984) and Black Celebration (1986).
 Vince DiCola: used the Synclavier extensively in creating studio albums; also for soundtracks Rocky IV (1985) and The Transformers: The Movie (1986).
 Duran Duran used a Synclavier on the 1984 single "The Reflex".
 Patrick Gleeson: film score composer. Used the Synclavier to score Apocalypse Now (1979) and The Plague Dogs (1982).
 Lourett Russell Grant used a Synclavier on the 1979 disco hit "Hot to Trot".
 Paul Hardcastle: composer and musician.
 Robert Henke: composer, musician and software engineer. Often recording under the moniker Monolake, Henke renovated a Synclavier II and used sampled FM from it on various releases.
 Michael Hoenig: film scoring work on the Synclavier, including the 1986 action-fantasy film, The Wraith.
 Trevor Horn: used the Synclavier to produce records by Frankie Goes to Hollywood, Yes, and Grace Jones' 1985 album Slave to the Rhythm, among others.
 Marlon Jackson
 Michael Jackson: particularly on his 1982 album Thriller, programming by Steve Porcaro, Brian Banks, and Anthony Marinelli. The gong sound at the beginning of "Beat It" comes courtesy of the Synclavier. The Synclavier was extensively used on Jackson's 1987 album Bad and on its accompanying tour, programmed and played by Christopher Currell. The Synclavier was also used by Andrew Scheps to slice and edit Jackson's beatboxing on his 1995 album HIStory.
 Eddie Jobson: the 1985 album Theme of Secrets was completely made with a Synclavier.
 Shane Keister: used in the 1987 American comedy film Ernest Goes to Camp.
 Mark Knopfler: Used on the scores for the films The Princess Bride (1987) and Last Exit to Brooklyn (1989), in which all sounds except guitar (and in the latter case, violins)  were produced by the Synclavier. The Synclavier is also heard on the Dire Straits albums Love over Gold (1982, played by Alan Clark), Brothers in Arms (1985, played by Guy Fletcher), and On Every Street (1991).
 Kraftwerk acquired one in the early to mid 1980s and initially used it to re work the material later released as Electric Cafe / Techno Pop, and also on live performances in the 1990s.
 Dave Lawson
 Mannheim Steamroller: used on most of their albums to present.
 John McLaughlin used it on the albums Mahavishnu (1984) and Adventures in Radioland (1987).
 Men Without Hats used on the 1984 album Folk of the 80s (Part III).
 Pat Metheny: American jazz guitarist.
 Walter "Junie" Morrison: used a Synclavier on his 1984 album, Evacuate Your Seats.
 Mr. Mister: used Synclavier on albums I Wear the Face (1984), Welcome to the Real World (1985), and Go On... (1987).
 Puscifer: the group used Synclavier on their 2020 album Existential Reckoning.
 Danny Quatrochi used Synclavier on Sting's album The Dream of the Blue Turtles (1985).
 Kashif Saleem, American post-disco and contemporary R&B record producer, multi-instrumentalist, also a creative consultant with the New England Digital Corporation: Bass synthesizer music pioneer and an early Synclavier II avid user who used Synclavier in production, for instance, of his Grammy-nominated instrumental piece "The Mood" (1983). His innovating vocalist-related sampling methods (created using Synclavier) are still in use.
 Howard Shore, film score composer: pictured with a Synclavier on the cover of Berklee Today, Fall 1997.
 Alan Silvestri: in producing the scores for the 1980s films The Clan of the Cave Bear (1986) and Flight of the Navigator (1986).
 Paul Simon: on Simon's 1983 album Hearts and Bones, Tom Coppola is credited for Synclavier for "When Numbers Get Serious", "Think Too Much (b)", "Song About the Moon", and "Think Too Much (a)"; and Wells Christie is credited with Synclavier on "Rene And Georgette Magritte With Their Dog After The War". On his 1986 album Graceland, Simon is credited under "Synclavier" for "I Know What I Know" and "Gumboots".
 Mark Snow: film and television score composer; Synclavier used on The X-Files (1993–2002).
 James Stroud: producer who used a Synclavier II on many hit albums he produced.
 Benny Andersson: his personal studio room is still centered around a Synclavier system — he has four systems. He’s been using it since Chess in 1985.
 Tangerine Dream: used a Synclavier on several of their studio albums including Exit in 1981.
 Mike Thorne: producer, one of the first musicians to buy a Synclavier; used it on records by Siouxsie and the Banshees, Soft Cell ("Tainted Love", 1981), Marc Almond, and Bronski Beat, among others.
 Pete Townshend: started using the Synclavier on the recording of All the Best Cowboys Have Chinese Eyes (1982).
 Triumph: Rik Emmett used a Synclavier 9600 around the period of Thunder Seven (1984) to Surveillance (1987).
 Whodini: Synclavier II was used on albums Escape (1984) and Back in Black (1986).
 Stevie Wonder: used a Synclavier to sample the voices of Clair Huxtable and children in an episode of The Cosby Show.
 Neil Young, who used an early Synclavier II on his 1981 album Re·ac·tor, and more extensively on his uncharacteristically electronic Trans (1982).
 Frank Zappa: in 1982 one of the first Synclavier owners; 1984's Thing-Fish (underscoring), Boulez Conducts Zappa: The Perfect Stranger (1984, underscoring) and Francesco Zappa (1984, solely Synclavier); 1985's Frank Zappa Meets the Mothers of Prevention (sampled sounds); 1986's Grammy-winning album Jazz from Hell ("St. Etienne" excepted, solely Synclavier); 1994's Civilization Phaze III completed in 1993 shortly before his death, released posthumously, musical portions composed and recorded exclusively using the Synclavier. Zappa also used the instrument to create the music posthumously released in 2011 on Feeding the Monkies at Ma Maison.

See also 
 Fostex Foundation 2000
 WaveFrame AudioFrame

Notes

References

Further reading

External links 
 "What Makes The Synclavier So Special And Different?" Steve Hills, Synclavier European Services
 "Synclavier Digital's About Page"

Products introduced in 1977
1977 establishments in the United States
American inventions
Music workstations
Samplers (musical instrument)
Digital synthesizers
Polyphonic synthesizers
Music sequencers